The Freddie Roach Soul Book (also referred to as simply  The Soul Book) is an album by American organist Freddie Roach released on Prestige in late 1966. It was his first album for Prestige after a two-year stint with Blue Note.

Track listing
All tracks by Roach, unless otherwise noted.

"Spacious" - 8:38
"Avatara" - 3:38
"Tenderly" (Gross, Lawrence) - 6:19
"One Track Mind" - 5:48
"You've Got Your Troubles" (Cook, Greenaway) - 4:36
"The Bees" - 6:40

Recorded on June 13 (#5) and June 28 (all others), 1966.

Personnel
Tracks 1-4, 6
Freddie Roach - organ
Buddy Terry - tenor saxophone
Vinnie Corrao - guitar
Jackie Mills - drums

Track 5
Freddie Roach - organ
Skeeter Best - guitar
Ray Lucas - drums
King Errisson - congas

References

Prestige Records albums
Transatlantic Records albums
Freddie Roach (organist) albums
Albums recorded at Van Gelder Studio
Albums produced by Ozzie Cadena
1966 albums